"Tonight" is a song by Italian musician Ken Laszlo, released in 1985 as the second single from his debut studio album, Ken Laszlo (1987). The song reached the top 10 in Sweden, peaking at No. 7 in March 1986. "Tonight" also charted in the Netherlands, Belgium and France, peaking at No. 24, No. 26 and No. 29, respectively.

Track listing and formats 

 Italian 7-inch single

A. "Tonight" – 3:59
B. "Tonight" (Instrumental) – 3:48

 Italian 12-inch single

A. "Tonight" – 5:45
B. "Tonight" (Instrumental) – 5:45

Credits and personnel 

 Ken Laszlo – vocals
 Sandro Oliva – songwriter, arranger
 Gino Caria – songwriter, arranger
 Stefano Cundari – producer, arranger, mixing
 Alessandro Zanni – producer, arranger
 Claudio Cattafesta – producer, arranger, mixing
 Emilio Tremolada – cover art, photographer

Credits and personnel adopted from the Ken Laszlo album and 7-inch single liner notes.

Charts

Weekly charts

References

External links 

 

1985 songs
1985 singles
Ken Laszlo songs
Memory Records singles